Kimberly Akimbo is a play written in 2000 by David Lindsay-Abaire. Its title character is a lonely teenage girl suffering from a disease similar to progeria, that causes her to age four and a half times as fast as normal, thus trapping her inside the frail physical body of an elderly woman.  She meets another misfit (a teenage boy) and the two form an attachment to one another that borders on attraction, but their situation is not helped by Kimberly's rapidly deteriorating health. Soon, Kimberly's family gets mixed up in some crazy money schemes, and the family is emotionally destroyed.

Plot
Act 1
The lights go up on Kimberly sitting and waiting for her father, who is late picking her up because of his drinking. He compensates by agreeing to take her to a burger joint for some food, where they meet Seth, the nerdy kid behind the window, who asks if Kim can do an interview for his project. Buddy strongly refuses and drives away. The scene changes to Pattie, Kimberly's mom, talking to a sound recorder to her unborn child about her life and how she believes she's a 'good mother'. Later on, Kimberly calls Seth and agrees to meet at the library later for the interview, as he is learning about progeria.

Characters
 Kimberly, a teenage girl with an aging disease who struggles to find happiness in a chaotic family where nobody understands her
 Buddy, her father, an alcoholic (becomes sober midway through the show) who only wants what's best for Kim
 Seth, a nerdy boy who is basically Kimberly's love interest, who is neglected by his father at home
 Pattie, Kimberly's mother who thinks she is dying and is pregnant with her second child
 Debra, Pattie's sister who causes the family some problems and lives with them on and off

Productions
The play was initially produced at the South Coast Repertory, Costa Mesa, California, from April 13 to May 13, 2001. Directed by David Petrarca, the cast starred Marylouise Burke as Kimberly. Lindsay-Abaire received the Kesselring Prize in November 2001 for this production. The production received the LA Drama Critics Circle Award for Writing in 2001.

Kimberly Akimbo premiered Off-Broadway at the Manhattan Theatre Club New York City Center Stage 1 on February 4, 2003 and closed on April 6, 2003. Directed by David Petrarca, the cast featured Marylouise Burke (Kimberly), John Gallagher, Jr. (Jeff), Ana Gasteyer (Debra), Jodie Markell (Pattie), Jake Weber (Buddy) and Daniel Zaitchik (Jeff).

Kimberly Akimbo ran from January 21, 2005 through March 6, 2005 at TheaterWorks in Hartford, Connecticut, directed by Rob Ruggiero. The production starred Rosemary Prinz as Kimberly.

Musical adaptation

A musical adaptation of the play premiered at Atlantic Theater Company in November 2021, with book and lyrics by Lindsay-Abaire and music by Jeanine Tesori. It was critically acclaimed, and won Best Musical prizes at the Drama Desk, Lucille Lortel, and Outer Critics Circle Awards. It began previews on Broadway on October 12, 2022 and opened on November 10 at the Booth Theatre.

Awards and nominations

2003 Off-Broadway premiere

References

External links
Dramatists.com

Plays by David Lindsay-Abaire
2000 plays